Fjälkinge is a locality situated in Kristianstad Municipality, Skåne County, Sweden with 1,690 inhabitants in 2010.

The etymology of the name indicates that the name originally may have meant "steep hill".

Fjälkinge Church is a well-preserved Romanesque church with late medieval frescos.

References 

Populated places in Kristianstad Municipality
Populated places in Skåne County